Asendorf is a municipality in the district of Diepholz, in Lower Saxony, Germany.

Asendorf is also very famous for Germany's first Museumseisenbahn. The track of this train is between Asendorf and Bruchhausen-Vilsen.

References

Diepholz (district)